The 1993–94 Ottawa Senators season was the National Hockey League (NHL) club's second season. It was an improvement by the club, as they finished with 13 more points than in the 1992–93 expansion season, as the club ended the season with a 14–61–9 record for 37 points. Even so, they had the worst record in hockey for the second consecutive year.

Off-season
On April 15, 1993, one day after the end of the 1992–93 season, general manager Mel Bridgman was fired. Randy Sexton became the general manager. Sexton would select Alexandre Daigle first overall in the 1993 NHL Entry Draft. On May 12, head coach Rick Bowness' contract was extended by three years.

On August 17, 1993, the Bruce Firestone era ended. Firestone sells his shares to Rod Bryden and resigned as chairman and governor of the Senators.

Regular season
The Senators finished last in wins (14), losses (61) and points (37), goals for (201), goals against (397), even-strength goals against (273), power-play goals against (110), penalty-kill percentage (73.30%) and shutouts for (0).

Alexei Yashin, the Senators first pick in the 1992 NHL Entry Draft, had a very promising rookie season, setting franchise records with 30 goals, 49 assists, and 79 points.  Alexandre Daigle, whom the Senators drafted with the first overall pick in the 1993 NHL Entry Draft, also had a very solid rookie season, recording 20 goals, 31 assists and 51 points to finish second to Yashin in team scoring.

Midway through the season, the Senators traded Bob Kudelski, who was having the best season on the team, registering 41 points (26 goals and 15 assists) in 42 games, to the Florida Panthers for Evgeny Davydov and Scott Levins.  The trade hurt the Senators as Davydov struggled with the team, while Levins production also dropped after the deal.

Craig Billington played the majority of games in the Senators net, as he was acquired from the New Jersey Devils in a deal that sent Peter Sidorkiewicz to New Jersey, and Billington set the team record for wins in a season with 11.

Final standings

Schedule and results

Player statistics

Regular season
Scoring

Goaltending

Awards and records
 Molson Cup – Alexei Yashin
 NHL All-Star Game selection – Alexei Yashin
 1994 Olympic Games selection – Derek Mayer (Canada)

Transactions

Trades

Waivers

Source:

Free agents

Draft picks
Ottawa's draft picks at the 1993 NHL Entry Draft in Quebec City, Quebec.

Farm teams
 Prince Edward Island Senators (American Hockey League)
 Thunder Bay Senators (Colonial Hockey League)

See also
1993–94 NHL season

References

Ottawa Senators seasons
O
O